Mustafa Yücel Özbilgin (June 20, 1942 – May 17, 2006) was a Turkish supreme court magistrate, who was shot dead in the Turkish Council of State courtroom in Ankara, Turkey on May 17, 2006 by Alparslan Arslan.

Death

The alleged reasoning for the murder of Mustafa Yücel Özbilgin and wounding of four of his fellow judges was that they had previously voted against a Turkish school teacher being allowed to wear a traditional Islamic headscarf outside work.  One of the judges who was shot, voted in favour of allowing the teacher to wear a headscarf outside of work, while the other judges who were wounded, voted against.

According to local news reports, the judges were in the midst of a daily meeting in the capital, when the gunman, who was later identified as a lawyer, burst into the room and fired his weapon. Mustafa Yücel Özbilgin suffered a gunshot wound to the head and was pronounced dead later that day in a hospital in Ankara. Police captured the gunman as he tried to escape. According to witnesses, the lawyer shouted, "Allahu Akbar (God is the greatest). His anger will be upon you!"

His death has led to demonstrations in Turkey of support for secularism. The President Ahmet Necdet Sezer was applauded as he attended the funeral and warned that "no-one will be able to overthrow the [secular] regime". The Turkish press has widely condemned the attacks. Also, the former secularist prime minister Bülent Ecevit attended his funeral in spite of his bad health condition. After the funeral, Ecevit had a cerebral hemorrhage and went into a coma.

The shooting represents a rise in tensions between the fundamentalist secular apparatus of state and supporters of religious rights, as well as Islamic fundamentalism.

See also 
Turkish Council of State shooting
Ergenekon (organization)
List of assassinated people from Turkey

Sources
ANA SAYFA (includes photo)

References

External links 
 In pictures: Turkey court shooting

1942 births
2006 deaths
People from Akçaabat
Turkish judges
Turkish civil servants
Assassinated Turkish civil servants
People murdered in Turkey
Deaths by firearm in Turkey
Governors of Adıyaman
Turkish Council of State shooting